The Personal Information Protection Law of the People's Republic of China (Chinese: 中华人民共和国个人信息保护法; pinyin: Zhōnghuá rénmín gònghéguó gèrén xìnxī bǎohù fǎ) referred to as the Personal Information Protection Law or ("PIPL") protecting personal information rights and interests, standardize personal information handling activities, and promote the rational use of personal information.  It also addresses the transfer of personal data outside of China.

The PIPL was adopted on August 20, 2021, and is effective November 1, 2021.
  It is related to, and builds on top of both China's Cybersecurity Law ("CSL") and China's Data Security Law ("DSL").  The PIPL is similar to, and partly based on, the European Union's GDPR.

An official English version for reference only was published on December 29, 2021.

History 
On August 20, 2021, the Standing Committee of the 13th National People's Congress passed the Private Information Protection Law or ("PIPL"). The law, which took effect on November 1, 2021, applies to the activities of handling the personal information of natural persons within the borders of the China.

Provisions

Scope 
The PIPL generally covers all organizations operating in China processing personal information.

Long Arm Jurisdiction 
Some provisions also include Long Arm Jurisdiction over data collection and processes of organizations outside of China. These apply when:

 The purpose is to provide products or services to natural persons inside the borders;
 Analyzing or assessing activities of natural persons inside the borders;
 Other circumstances provided in laws or administrative regulations.

This presumably applies to offshore or multi-national companies with Chinese customers in China, for example Amazon who might be shipping goods to a Chinese buyer, or Apple who may have Chinese users in the American App Store.

All such entities are required to establish a dedicated entity or appoint a representative within China.

Exemptions 
There are few exemptions, but one that was added during late drafting provides a non-consent legal basis for handling employee data, though employee consent is still needed for overseas transfer, such as to a global corporate parent.

Key Themes 
Individual privacy, control and consent are consistent themes throughout the law, which lays down key principles including:

 Personal Information - Defining personal information, including sensitive information;
 Legal Basis - All data collection must have a legal basis for collection.  There are several bases, but unlike in the GDPR, there is no legitimate interests basis;
 Consent - A key legal basis is consent, which, unlike in the GDPR, must be obtained for each type of data processing activity, especially for transferring an individual's data overseas.  Consent must also be "informed" with various types of notification and required content specified in the law;
 Sensitive Data - Some types of personal information is sensitive, and the law provides an open-ended list of examples (unlike the GDPR's specific list of "special categories"), including biometrics, religion, specially-designated status, medical health, financial accounts, and location tracking;
 Protecting Children - All personal information of minors under the age of 14 is sensitive, and specific consent is required from parents to process this information.  This is much stricter than in the GDPR;
 Individual Rights - The PIPL gives individuals several key rights over their information, such as the right to correct, delete, and view or transfer the data collected about them.
 Responsibilities - Several articles lay out the various responsibilities of various parties collecting, transferring, and handling personal information;
 Government Use of Personal Information - The PIPL includes when and how government agencies can collect and process data on individuals, including for national security, emergency, and other purposes;
 Overseas Transfers - Specific restrictions on transfer of personal data outside of China;
 Enforcement - Severe penalties for violations.

Definitions 
The law defines the following:

 Personal Information - Any type of information that identifies or can identify natural persons recorded electronically or by other means, but does not include anonymized information.
 Sensitive Personal Information - Personal information that once leaked or illegally used can easily cause natural persons to suffer encroachments on their dignity or harms to their persons or property; including information such as biometrics (including facial recognition), religious faith, particular identities, medical care and health, financial status, and location tracking, as well as the personal information of minors under the age of 14.

 Individuals - People whose data is being collected for processed (similar to the GDPR's Data Subject).
 Personal Information Handlers: - Organizations or individuals that independently make decisions about the purposes and methods of personal information handling in personal information handling activities.
 Entrusted Persons - External entities who Information Handlers entrust to handle personal information, essentially third parties.
 Large Processors - Companies that process large amounts of data, as defined in Article 40, including Critical Information Infrastructure Operators ("CIIO") from the China's Critical Infrastructure Regulations.
 Handling of Personal Information: Personal information handling includes personal information collection, storage, use, processing, transmission, provision, disclosure, deletion, etc.
 Automated Decision-Making: The use of computer programs to automatically analyse, evaluate, and make decisions on personal information on personal behavior habits, hobbies or economic, health, credit status, and so forth.
 De-Identification: The process of handling personal information to make it impossible to identify a specific natural person without the help of additional information.
 Anonymization: The process in which personal information is handled so that it cannot be used to identify a specific natural person and cannot be restored after being so handled.

Legal Basis 
All personal information collection and processing must have one of the following legal bases:

 Individuals’ consent obtained;
 Where necessary to conclude or fulfill a contract in which the individual is an interested party, or where necessary to conduct human resources management according to lawfully formulated labor rules and structures and lawfully concluded collective contracts;
 Where necessary to fulfill statutory duties and responsibilities or statutory obligations;
 Where necessary to respond to sudden public health incidents or protect natural persons’ lives and health, or the security of their property, under emergency conditions;
 Handling personal information within a reasonable scope to implement news reporting, public opinion supervision, and other such activities for the public interest;
 When handling personal information disclosed by persons themselves or otherwise already lawfully disclosed, within a reasonable scope in accordance with the provisions of this Law.
 Other circumstances provided in laws and administrative regulations.

Unlike in the GDPR, there is no legitimate interests basis.  Therefore, most consumers will likely be covered by giving their direct consent (such as for cookies, newsletters, etc.) or by contract fulfillment (such as shipping goods to them or providing services).

Consent 
Consent is a major concern of the PIPL and a key legal basis on which handlers can process personal information.

If there is no other legal basis for processing data, handlers must get consent for data collection and processing, and this consent can be revoked by any individual at any time.  Handlers are not allowed to refuse to provide products or services if an individual withholds or withdraws their consent for non-essential processing.

Separate consent is also specifically required in a number of situations:

 Transfer of personal data by data controllers to third parties (Article 23);
 Publication of personal data (Article 25);
 Publication or provision of personal data collected by equipment installed in the public places for security purposes, such as personal images (Article 26);
 Processing of sensitive personal data (Article 29); and
 Cross-border transfers of personal data (Article 39).

Consent for these situations cannot be "bundled" and thus must be obtained separately from the individual.

Where a change occurs in the purpose of personal information handling, the handling method, or the categories of handled personal information, the individual's consent shall be obtained again.

Individual Rights 
Individuals have several specific rights under the PIPL - they can:

 Know & Decide - Refuse and limit how their data is handled.
 Access & Copy - View and copy their data.
 Correct or Complete - Request to correct inaccurate data.
 Erasure - Request their information be deleted and/or revoke consent.
 Explanation - Request handlers explain their handling of an individual's personal information.
 Portability - Request moving their data to another handler.

Automated Decision Making 
There are specific rules for automated decision making in the PIPL, including the right of individuals to opt-out, such as disabling product recommendations.

The law specifically requires "transparency of the decision-making and the fairness and justice of the handling result shall be guaranteed, and they may not engage in unreasonable differential treatment of individuals in trading conditions such as trade price, etc."

For companies pushing delivery or commercial sales to individuals through automated decision-making methods shall simultaneously provide the option to not target an individual's characteristics, or provide the individual with a convenient method to refuse.

When the use of automated decision-making produces decisions with a major influence on the rights and interests of the individual, they have the right to require personal information handlers to explain the matter, and they have the right to refuse that personal information handlers make decisions solely through automated decision-making methods.

Automated Decision Making is defined as "refers to the activity of using computer programs to automatically analyze or assess personal behaviors, habits, interests, or hobbies, or financial, health, credit, or other status, and make decisions."

Facial Recognition 
The PIPL specifically covers the use of facial recognition in public spaces, including that it can only be used for public security reasons unless each individual separately consents:

"The installation of image collection or personal identity recognition equipment in public venues shall occur as required to safeguard public security and observe relevant State regulations, and clear indicating signs shall be installed. Collected personal images and personal distinguishing identity characteristic information can only be used for the purpose of safeguarding public security; it may not be used for other purposes, except where individuals’ separate consent is obtained."

Handler Obligations 
Personal information handlers have several specific obligations:

 Formulating internal management structures and operating rules;
 Implementing categorized management of personal information;
 Adopting corresponding technical security measures such as encryption, de-identification, etc.;
 Reasonably determining operational limits for personal information handling, and regularly conducting security education and training for employees;
 Formulating and organizing the implementation of personal information security incident response plans;
 Other measures provided in laws or administrative regulations.

All handlers must "regularly engage in audits of their personal information handling and compliance with laws and administrative regulations."

Personal Information Protection Officers 
In addition, at a certain (not yet defined) data handling scale, handlers must appoint "personal information protection officers, to be responsible for supervising personal information handling activities as well as adopted protection measures, etc."

Impact Assessment 
Under the following circumstances, handlers must perform a personal information protection impact assessment and report the results:

 Handling sensitive personal information;
 Using personal information to conduct automated decision-making;
 Entrusting personal information handling, providing personal information to other personal information handlers, or disclosing personal information;
 Providing personal information abroad;
 Other personal information handling activities with a major influence on individuals.

Such assessments must include:

 Whether or not the personal information handling purpose, handling method, etc., are lawful, legitimate, and necessary;
 The influence on individuals' rights and interests, and the security risks;
 Whether protective measures undertaken are legal, effective, and suitable to the degree of risk.

Data Localization 
The PIPL has specific requirements on data localization, the storage and processing of personal information in China.

Data Security 
Information handlers have several responsibilities, including adopting the following measures to ensure personal information handling conforms to the provisions of laws and administrative regulations, and prevent unauthorized access as well as personal information leaks, distortion, or loss:

 Formulating internal management structures and operating rules;
 Implementing categorized management of personal information;
 Adopting corresponding technical security measures such as encryption, de-identification, etc.;
 Reasonably determining operational limits for personal information handling, and regularly conducting security education and training for employees;
 Formulating and organizing the implementation of personal information security incident response plans;
 Other measures provided in laws or administrative regulations.

Impact Assessments 
Impact Assessments are required in a number of situations, including:

 Handling sensitive personal information;
 Using personal information to conduct automated decision-making;
 Entrusting personal information handling, providing personal information to other personal information handlers, or disclosing personal information;
 Providing personal information abroad;
 Other personal information handling activities with a major influence on individuals.

Contractual Elements 
Agreements are required when a handler entrusts personal data handing to another handler.  Some law firms have suggested this will resuit in specific standard contractual clauses ("SCC"), similar to in the GDPR.

Breach Notification 
All data leaks must be reported internally, and if "harm may have been created" they may be required to notify the individuals affected.  Notification details must include:

 The information categories, causes, and possible harm caused by the leak, distortion, or loss that occurred or might have occurred;
 The remedial measures taken by the personal information handler and measures individuals can adopt to mitigate harm;
 Contact method of the personal information handler.

Large Handlers 
Large-scale handlers, such as those "providing important Internet platform services, that have a large number of users, and whose business models are complex" also have the obligations:

 Establish and complete personal information protection compliance systems and structures according to State regulations, and establish an independent body composed mainly of outside members to supervise personal information protection circumstances;
 Abide by the principles of openness, fairness, and justice; formulate platform rules; and clarify the standards for intra-platform product or service providers' handling of personal information and their personal information protection duties;
 Stop providing services to product or service providers on the platform that seriously violate laws or administrative regulations in handling personal information;
 Regularly release personal information protection social responsibility reports, and accept society's supervision.

Overseas Transfers 
Moving personal information outside of China is only allowed if one of these conditions is satisfied:

 Passing a security assessment organized by the State cybersecurity and information department according to Article 40 of this Law;
 Undergoing personal information protection certification conducted by a specialized body according to provisions by the State cybersecurity and information department;
 Concluding a contract with the foreign receiving side in accordance with a standard contract formulated by the State cyberspace and information department, agreeing upon the rights and responsibilities of both sides;
 Other conditions provided in laws or administrative regulations or by the State cybersecurity and information department.

All such transfers require each individual's separate consent and notification about "the foreign receiving side’s name or personal name, contact method, handling purpose, handling methods, and personal information categories, as well as ways or procedures for individuals to exercise the rights provided in this Law with the foreign receiving side, and other such matters."

Sharing data with foreign governments 
Information handlers are prohibited from sharing any personal information with foreign judicial or law enforcement agencies with approval.

This has raised concerns among law firms about how multi-national corporations would or could respond to judicial inquiries in other countries, such as a warrant for data held about a Chinese citizen in those countries.

Government Departments 
The PIPL includes legal basis for how government ("State Organs") can collect and process data.  Generally, the government must follow the same rules as non-government entities, including notifications.  There are some exceptions, such as when it "shall impede State organs’ fulfillment of their statutory duties and responsibilities".

Enforcement 
The PIPL has several enforcement mechanisms, including warnings, orders to stop illegal activity, fines, and confiscation of unlawful income.  Illegal acts may also be recorded in China's Social Credit System.  In addition, individuals can also sue handlers for violation of their rights.

Reactions 

Initial reaction has been mostly by numerous law firms publishing notices and whitepapers outlining the new law, its key provisions, and recommended initial courses of action to prepare for compliance.

Articles of the Law 

The PIPL has eight chapters and 73 articles, concerning processing rules, sensitive data, government data use, cross-border transfers, rights of individuals, processor obligations, legal liabilities, and miscellaneous supplemental provisions.

Chapter 1 - General Provisions

 Article 1 - Purpose
 Article 2 - Legal protection of personal information
 Article 3 - General scope
 Article 4 - Personal Information and handling definition
 Article 5 - Principles of legality, propriety, necessity, and sincerity
 Article 6 - Clear and reasonable purpose
 Article 7 - Openness and transparency
 Article 8 - Quality of personal information
 Article 9 -  Personal information handlers bear responsibility
 Article 10 - No illegally collection, use, processing, or transmission of personal information
 Article 11 - Personal information protection structure
 Article 12 - International rules and norms for personal information protection

Chapter 2 - Personal Information Handling Rules

Section 1: Ordinary Provisions

 Article 13 - Legal basis for processing
 Article 14 - Consent and notification
 Article 15 - Consent and revocation
 Article 16 - No service refusal if consent is revoked
 Article 17 - Notifications
 Article 18 - Notification exclusions
 Article 19 - Information retention periods
 Article 20 - Joint handling
 Article 21 - Entrusted handling
 Article 22 - Handling transfers
 Article 23 - Providing information to other handlers
 Article 24 - Automated decision making
 Article 25 - Information disclosure prohibited
 Article 26 - Facial recognition limits
 Article 27 - Handling public information

Section II: Rules for Handling Sensitive Personal Information

 Article 28 - Sensitive information definition
 Article 29 - Separate consent for sensitive information handling
 Article 30 - Sensitive information notification
 Article 31 - Personal information of minors
 Article 32 - Application of other restrictions on sensitive information

Section III: Specific Provisions on State Organs Handling Personal Information

 Article 33 - Application to state organs
 Article 34 - State organ requirements
 Article 35 - Notification duties
 Article 36 - Data storage in China requirement
 Article 37 - Public affairs

Chapter 3 - Cross-Border Provision of Personal Information

 Article 38 - Conditions for transfers
 Article 39 - Notification and consent
 Article 40 - Large scale processor requirements
 Article 41 - Foreign judicial or law enforcement agency requests
 Article 42 - Violations and enforcement
 Article 43 - Foreign country or region discriminatory prohibitions

Chapter 4 - Individuals’ Rights

 Article 44 - Right to know, decide, limit, and refuse
 Article 45 - Right to consult, copy, and transfer information
 Article 46 - Right to correct
 Article 47 - Right to delete
 Article 48 - Right to request explanation
 Article 49 - Rights of deceased
 Article 50 - Requirements for handlers to process rights requests

Chapter 5 - Personal Information Handlers’ Duties

 Article 51 - Personal information protection program
 Article 52 - Designating representatives
 Article 52 - Designating representatives for international handlers
 Article 54 - Auditing
 Article 55 - Impact assessment criteria
 Article 56 - Impact assessment requirements
 Article 57 - Data breaches notification
 Article 58 - Internet platform requirements
 Article 59 - Entrusted persons requirements

Chapter 6 - Departments Fulfilling Personal Information Protection Duties and Responsibilities

 Article 60 - State cybersecurity and information department roles
 Article 61 - Protection department roles
 Article 62 - Oversight requirements
 Article 63 - Protection department measures
 Article 64 - Protection enforcement
 Article 65 - Complaints and whistle blowers

Chapter 7 - Legal Liability

 Article 66 - Right to complain
 Article 67 - Monetary penalties
 Article 68 - Administrative fines and criminal responsibility
 Article 69 - Liability for damages
 Article 70 - Legal action
 Article 71 - Punishment and criminal liability

Chapter 8 - Supplemental Provisions

 Article 72 - Exemption for personal or family affairs
 Article 73 - Definitions
 Article 74 - Start date

See also 

 Cybersecurity Law of the People's Republic of China (CSL)
 Data Security Law of the People's Republic of China (DSL)
 Information Privacy
 General Data Protection Regulation (GDPR)
 California Consumer Privacy Act (CCPA)
 Children's Online Privacy Protection Act (COPPA)
 EU–US Privacy Shield
 Human rights
 Data portability
 Do Not Track legislation
 Privacy Impact Assessment

Citations

External links 

 China NPC Law (Chinese)
 General Data Protection Regulation text
 Data protection, European Commission
 Procedure 2012/0011/COD, EUR-Lex
 Handbook on European data protection law, European Union Agency for Fundamental Rights
 China PIPL - Overview

Privacy law
Information privacy
Data protection
2021 in China
Law of the People's Republic of China